Myles Hollander (born March 21, 1941) is an American academic statistician who has made research contributions to nonparametric methods, biostatistics, and reliability. He was born in Brooklyn, New York. He is Emeritus and Robert O. Lawton Distinguished Professor of Statistics at Florida State University. He is a Fellow of the American Statistical Association, the Institute of Mathematical Statistics, and the International Statistical Institute.

References

External links
 Florida State University faculty profile

Florida State University faculty
Fellows of the American Statistical Association
Living people
1941 births